David Boehm (1 February 1893 in New York – 31 July 1962 in Santa Monica, California) was an American screenwriter.

He is best known for the 1944 World War II heavenly fantasy A Guy Named Joe (remade by Steven Spielberg in 1989 as Always), for which he received an Academy Award nomination. He also contributed scripts to Gold Diggers of 1933, Ex-Lady (1933), and Knickerbocker Holiday (1944).

Selected filmography
 Grand Slam (1933)

References

External links

American male screenwriters
1893 births
1962 deaths
20th-century American male writers
20th-century American screenwriters